Abbasabad (also Romanized as ‘Abbāsābād) is a village in Shahidabad Rural District, Mashhad-e Morghab District, Khorrambid County, Fars Province, Iran. At the 2006 census, its population was 27, in 9 families.

References 

Populated places in Khorrambid County